Hardware backdoors are backdoors in hardware, such as code inside hardware or firmware of computer chips. The backdoors may be directly implemented as hardware Trojans in the integrated circuit.

Hardware backdoors are intended to undermine security in smartcards and other cryptoprocessors unless investment is made in anti-backdoor design methods. They have also been considered for car hacking.

Severity
Hardware backdoors are considered highly problematic because:
 They can’t be removed by conventional means such as antivirus software
 They can circumvent other types of security such as disk encryption
 They can be injected at manufacturing time where the user has no degree of control

Examples

 Around 2008 the FBI reported that 3,500 counterfeit Cisco network components were discovered in the US with some of them having found their way into military and government facilities.
 In 2011 Jonathan Brossard demonstrated a proof-of-concept hardware backdoor called "Rakshasa" which can be installed by anyone with physical access to hardware.  It uses coreboot to re-flash the BIOS with a SeaBIOS and iPXE benign bootkit built of legitimate, open-source tools and can fetch malware over the web at boot time.
 In 2012, Sergei Skorobogatov (from the University of Cambridge computer laboratory) and Woods controversially stated that they had found a backdoor in a military-grade FPGA device which could be exploited to access/modify sensitive information. It has been said that this was proven to be a software problem and not a deliberate attempt at sabotage that still brought to light the need for equipment manufacturers to ensure microchips operate as intended.
 In 2012 two mobile phones developed by Chinese device manufacturer ZTE were found to carry a backdoor to instantly gain root access via a password that had been hard-coded into the software. This was confirmed by security researcher Dmitri Alperovitch.
 U.S. sources have pointed the finger of suspicion at Huawei hardware since at least 2012, suggesting the possibility of the presence of backdoors in Huawei products.
 In 2013 researchers with the University of Massachusetts devised a method of breaking a CPU's internal cryptographic mechanisms by introducing specific impurities into the crystalline structure of transistors to change Intel's random-number generator.
 Documents revealed from 2013 onwards during the surveillance disclosures initiated by Edward Snowden showed that the Tailored Access Operations (TAO) unit and other NSA employees intercepted servers, routers, and other network gear being shipped to organizations targeted for surveillance to install covert implant firmware onto them before delivery. These tools include custom BIOS exploits that survive the reinstallation of operating systems and USB cables with spy hardware and radio transceiver packed inside.
 In June 2016 it was reported that University of Michigan Department of Electrical Engineering and Computer Science had built a hardware backdoor that leveraged "analog circuits to create a hardware attack" so that after the capacitors store up enough electricity to be fully charged, it would be switched on, to give an attacker complete access to whatever system or device − such as a PC − that contains the backdoored chip. In the study that won the "best paper" award at the IEEE Symposium on Privacy and Security they also note that microscopic hardware backdoor wouldn't be caught by practically any modern method of hardware security analysis, and could be planted by a single employee of a chip factory.
 In September 2016 Skorobogatov showed how he had removed a NAND chip from an iPhone 5C - the main memory storage system used on many Apple devices - and cloned it so that he can try out more incorrect combinations than allowed by the attempt-counter.
 In October 2018 Bloomberg reported that an attack by Chinese spies reached almost 30 U.S. companies, including Amazon and Apple, by compromising America's technology supply chain.

Countermeasures

Skorobogatov has developed a technique capable of detecting malicious insertions into chips.

New York University Tandon School of Engineering researchers have developed a way to corroborate a chip's operation using verifiable computing whereby "manufactured for sale" chips contain an embedded verification module that proves the chip's calculations are correct and an associated external module validates the embedded verification module. Another technique developed by researchers at University College London (UCL) relies on distributing trust between multiple identical chips from disjoint supply chains. Assuming that at least one of those chips remains honest the security of the device is preserved.

Researchers at the University of Southern California Ming Hsieh Department of Electrical and Computer Engineering and the Photonic Science Division at the Paul Scherrer Institute have developed a new technique called Ptychographic X-ray laminography. This technique is the only current method that allows for verification of the chips blueprint and design without destroying or cutting the chip. It also does so in significantly less time than other current methods. Anthony F. J. Levi Professor of electrical and computer engineering at University of Southern California explains “It’s the only approach to non-destructive reverse engineering of electronic chips—[and] not just reverse engineering but assurance that chips are manufactured according to design. You can identify the foundry, aspects of the design, who did the design. It’s like a fingerprint.” This method currently is able to scan chips in 3D and zoom in on sections and can accommodate chips up to 12 millimeters by 12 millimeters easily accommodating an Apple A12 chip but not yet able to scan a full Nvidia Volta GPU. "Future versions of the laminography technique could reach a resolution of just 2 nanometers or reduce the time for a low-resolution inspection of that 300-by-300-micrometer segment to less than an hour, the researchers say."

See also
 Clipper chip
 FBI–Apple encryption dispute
 Hardware security
 Hardware security bug
 Hardware Trojan
 
 Zombie Zero
 Open hardware
 Code signing
 Intel Management Engine
 AMD Platform Security Processor

References

Further reading
 

Espionage techniques
Computer hardware
Surveillance
Cryptographic attacks
Cyberwarfare
Malware